Australia Calling – All the Best Vol 2 is a greatest hits album by Australian country music artist John Williamson. The album is the second All the Best following the first edition released in 1986. Australia Calling – All the Best Vol 2 was released in October 1992 and peaked at number 32 on the ARIA Charts and was certified platinum in 1994.

Track listing

Charts

Certifications

Release history

References

1992 compilation albums
John Williamson (singer) compilation albums
EMI Records compilation albums